Japan  competed at the 2016 Summer Paralympics in Rio de Janeiro, Brazil, from 7 September to 18 September 2016.  The country qualified athletes in cycling, goalball, judo, sailing, and wheelchair basketball.

While the first-ever (and only) failure to score Gold in Summer Paralympics was disappointing, resulting in a 64th rank, the number of total medals ranked 17th. Despite this, Tokyo will be the host city of the 2020 Summer Paralympics, a Japanese segment was performed during the closing ceremony.

Support 
In September 2015, a representative from the country attended the Rio 2016 Paralympic Games Chef de Mission seminar as part of the country's preparation efforts for the 2016 Games.

Disability classifications

Every participant at the Paralympics has their disability grouped into one of five disability categories; amputation, the condition may be congenital or sustained through injury or illness; cerebral palsy; wheelchair athletes, there is often overlap between this and other categories; visual impairment, including blindness; Les autres, any physical disability that does not fall strictly under one of the other categories, for example dwarfism or multiple sclerosis. Each Paralympic sport then has its own classifications, dependent upon the specific physical demands of competition. Events are given a code, made of numbers and letters, describing the type of event and classification of the athletes competing. Some sports, such as athletics, divide athletes by both the category and severity of their disabilities, other sports, for example swimming, group competitors from different categories together, the only separation being based on the severity of the disability.

Medallists

Cycling 

With one pathway for qualification being one highest ranked NPCs on the UCI Para-Cycling male and female Nations Ranking Lists on 31 December 2014, Japan qualified for the 2016 Summer Paralympics in Rio, assuming they continued to meet all other eligibility requirements.

Equestrian 
Through the Para Equestrian Individual Ranking List Allocation method, the country earned a pair of slots at the Rio Games for their two highest ranked equestrian competitors.  These slots were irrespective of class ranking.

Goalball 

The Japan women's national goalball team qualified for the Rio Games after finishing first at the 2015 IBSA Goalball Asian-Pacific Championships. Japan's women enter the tournament ranked 3rd in the world.

Judo 

In total judoka representing Japan won one silver medal and three bronze medals.

Sailing

One pathway for qualifying for Rio involved having a boat have top seven finish at the 2015 Combined World Championships in a medal event where the country had nor already qualified through via the 2014 IFDS Sailing World Championships.  Japan qualified for the 2016 Games under this criteria in the Sonar event with a sixteenth-place finish overall and the seventh country who had not qualified via the 2014 Championships.  The boat was crewed by Shin'ya Yamamoto (sailor), Junichi Ohnuma and Koji Ishii.

Shooting 

The first opportunity to qualify for shooting at the Rio Games took place at the 2014 IPC Shooting World Championships in Suhl. Shooters earned spots for their NPC.  Japan earned a qualifying spot at this event in the R5 – 10m Air Rifle Mixed Prone SH2  event as a result of the performance Akiko Sega.  It was the only qualification spot Japan earned at the event.

Swimming

The top two finishers in each Rio medal event at the 2015 IPC Swimming World Championships earned a qualifying spot for their country for Rio. Yasuhiro Tanaka earned Japan a spot after winning silver in the Men's 100m Breaststroke SB14.

Wheelchair basketball

The Japan men's national wheelchair basketball team has qualified for the 2016 Rio Paralympics.

Wheelchair rugby 

Japan entered the tournament ranked number three in the world.

Preliminary round

Semifinals

Bronze Medal Match

Wheelchair tennis 

Shingo Kunieda is expected to represent Japan in wheelchair tennis. He would go to Rio as the defending 2008 and 2012 Paralympic gold medalist. Shingo Kunieda, Takuya Miki, Satoshi Saida, Takashi Sanada all qualified in the men's singles event via the standard qualification route.  Japan qualified three players in the women's singles event. Kanako Domori, Yui Kamiji and Miho Nijo all qualified via the standard qualification route.

See also
Japan at the 2016 Summer Olympics

References

Nations at the 2016 Summer Paralympics
2016
2016 in Japanese sport